Progress MS-18, Russian production No. 447, identified by NASA as Progress 79P, was a Progress spaceflight operated by Roscosmos to resupply the International Space Station (ISS). This was the 170th flight of a Progress spacecraft.

History 
The Progress MS is an uncrewed freighter based on the Progress-M featuring improved avionics. This improved variant first launched on 21 December 2015. It has the following improvements:

 New external compartment that enables it to deploy satellites. Each compartment can hold up to four launch containers. First time installed on Progress MS-03.
 Enhanced redundancy thanks to the addition of a backup system of electrical motors for the docking and sealing mechanism.
 Improved Micrometeoroid (MMOD) protection with additional panels in the cargo compartment.
 Luch Russian relay satellites link capabilities enable telemetry and control even when not in direct view of ground radio stations.
 GNSS autonomous navigation enables real time determination of the status vector and orbital parameters dispensing with the need of ground station orbit determination.
 Real time relative navigation thanks to direct radio data exchange capabilities with the space station.
 New digital radio that enables enhanced TV camera view for the docking operations.
 The Ukrainian Chezara Kvant-V on board radio system and antenna/feeder system has been replaced with a Unified Command Telemetry System (UCTS).
 Replacement of the Kurs A with Kurs NA digital system.

Launch 
On 3 February 2021, Roskosmos approved the updated flight program to the International Space Station for 2021, highlighted with the addition of two permanent modules to the Russian Segment of the outpost. A short tourist visit to the ISS at the end of the year also got the green light.

A Soyuz-2.1a launched Progress MS-18 to the International Space Station from Baikonur Site 31 on 28 October 2021 on a two-day, 36 orbit rendezvous profile. If the air leak repairs planned for Zvezda's PrK chamber (delivery of sealing patches aboard Progress MS-16 in February 2021) were successful, then 3 hours 20 minutes after the launch Progress MS-18 would have attempted to automatically dock to Zvezda's aft port.

The vehicle docked to the aft port of the Zvezda Service Module (SM), on 30 October 2021, at 01:31:19 UTC, and was planned to remain in orbit for 215 days, supporting the Expedition 66 mission aboard the ISS.

Cargo 

 Dry cargo: 
 Fuel: 
 Oxygen: 
 Water:

Means of attachment of large payloads
It also delivered the LCCS part MLM Means of Attachment of Large payloads to ISS. It is a 4 segment external payload interface called means of attachment of large payloads (Sredstva Krepleniya Krupnogabaritnykh Obyektov, SKKO) According to plans, once the nadir end of SKKO was soft docked to Nauka and bolted down, the launch locks on SKKO would be released by the spacewalkers to allow it to be unfolded and extended with its joints self locking in the extended position to create a rigid frame. Then the Zenith end of SKKO would be soft docked to Nauka and bolted down. The 3 passive payload adapters and the one active payload adapter (i.e. active remote sensing payload like MIR Priroda's Travers Synthetic Aperture Radar) would then be outfitted. The SKKO was derived from the setup used on the Priroda module. SKKO was launched inside the progress and transferred inside to a temporary storage location inside one of the station modules. It would be taken outside and installed on the aft facing side of Nauka during the VKD-60 spacewalk. SCCS part of MLM Means of Attachment of Large payloads was delivered to ISS by Progress MS-21 spacecraft. It was taken outside and installed on the ERA aft facing base point on Nauka during the VKD-55 spacewalk.

Undocking and decay 
The Progress MS-18 remained docked at the station until 1 June 2022, when it departed with trash and re-entered the Earth's atmosphere for destruction over the South Pacific Ocean.

See also 
 Uncrewed spaceflights to the International Space Station

References 

Progress (spacecraft) missions
2021 in Russia
Supply vehicles for the International Space Station
Spacecraft launched by Soyuz-2 rockets
Spacecraft launched in 2021
Spacecraft which reentered in 2022